The House of Traba (or Trava), sometimes called the Fróilaz-Traba, was a Galician noble family of the high Middle Ages. The family can be traced back to the eleventh century. They are associated with a castle named Traba, probably in the county of Bergantiños, and also with the county of Trastámara.

Bibliography

 

Noble families
Medieval Galicia (Spain)
Galician nobility